Lisa Lisa & Cult Jam with Full Force is the debut album of Lisa Lisa & Cult Jam in collaboration with the band and production team, Full Force, released on Columbia Records on August 2, 1985. It is best known for the lead tracks, "I Wonder If I Take You Home", "Can You Feel the Beat" and "All Cried Out". The third of these hits also features Full Force's Paul Anthony and Bowlegged Lou on vocals.

Critical reception 
In a contemporary review for The Village Voice, music critic Robert Christgau gave the album a "C+" and found Lisa Lisa's singing amateurish and comparable to "a Rosie & the Originals for our more pretentious time." In a retrospective review, AllMusic's Ron Wynn wrote that, along with her singing's "perfect mix of uncertainty, irony, and edge," the album is highlighted by "I Wonder If I Take You Home" and "All Cried Out", which he said is "arguably still her finest performance."

Track listing

Charts

Personnel

Lisa Lisa & Cult Jam
Lisa Lisa: Lead and backing vocals
Alex "Spanador" Moseley: Guitars, bass, keyboards
Mike Hughes: Timbales, percussion, rap

Full Force
Paul "Anthony" George: Vocals
Lucien "Bow-Legged Lou" George Jr.: Vocals
Curt "Curt-T-T" Bedeau: Guitars
Gerry "Baby Gee" Charles: Keyboards
Junior "Shy Shy" Clark: Bass
Brian "B-Fine" George: Drums, percussion, drum programming

References

Lisa Lisa and Cult Jam albums
1985 debut albums
Albums produced by Full Force